Peter Green Splinter Group is an album by the British blues band of the same name, led by Peter Green. Released in 1997, this was their first album, and essentially the comeback album for Green, who had been out of the music business for around 10 years. Green was the founder of Fleetwood Mac and a member of that group from 1967–70, before a sporadic solo career during the late 1970s and early 1980s.

Mostly recorded live on a tour of the UK, the album consisted of covers of blues songs, written mainly by very well known and established artists.

Track listing
"Hitch Hiking Woman" (Black Ace) – 3:46
"Travelling Riverside Blues" (Robert Johnson) – 3:26
"Look on Yonder Wall" (Elmore James) – 6:26
"Homework" (Dave Clark, Al Perkins) – 3:56
"The Stumble" (Freddie King, Sonny Thompson) – 4:22
"Help Me" (Sonny Boy Williamson II, Willie Dixon, Ralph Bass) – 5:47
"Watch Your Step" (Bobby Parker) – 3:51
"From 4' Till Late" (Johnson) – 2:55
"Steady Rollin' Man" (Johnson) – 3:41
"It Takes Time" (Otis Rush) – 5:06
"Dark End Of The Street" (Dan Penn, Chips Moman) – 3:59
"Going Down" (Don Nix) – 7:43

The album incorrectly lists the composer of track 4 as Otis Rush. Rush was the first person to record the song in 1962, but did not compose it.

Japanese issue bonus track
"The Green Manalishi" (Peter Green)

Tracks 1 & 2 are studio recordings.
Tracks 3–13 are recorded live.

Personnel

Peter Green Splinter Group
 Peter Green – guitars, vocals
 Nigel Watson – guitars, vocals
 Cozy Powell – drums
 Neil Murray – bass guitar
 Spike Edney – keyboards

Technical
 Tim Summerhayes, Robin Black, Ian Dyekhoff – engineers
 Spike Edney – remix engineer at Blackbarn Studios
 Al at Spot On – design
 Will Riley of Underworld – logo

References

1997 debut albums
Peter Green Splinter Group albums